Florencio Olvera Ochoa (12 October 1933 – 20 December 2020) was a Mexican Bishop of the Roman Catholic Diocese of Cuernavaca from 2002 to 2009.

Olvera was born in Tequisquiapan, Mexico. He was ordained priest in Querétaro in 1958, was appointed bishop of Tabasco in 1992 and bishop of Cuernavaca in 2002. On 10 July 2009 Pope Benedict XVI accepted his resignation for reaching the age limit of 75 years.

Ochoa died from COVID-19 in 2020.

Electoral Decalogue 
Ignoring Mexican electoral laws, Bishop Olvera published an "Electoral Decalogue" that attempts to indicate to Mexican Roman Catholics for which political party to vote in the 2009 legislative election.

References and sources 
 Bishop Florencio Olvera Ochoa
 Obispo alienta a mexicanos a elegir sabiamente con decálogo electoral
 Cita Gobernación a Florencio Olvera, obispo de Cuernavaca 
 

Specific

1933 births
2020 deaths
21st-century Roman Catholic bishops in Mexico
20th-century Roman Catholic bishops in Mexico
Roman Catholic bishops of Tabasco
Deaths from the COVID-19 pandemic in Mexico